Ktyr is an Old World genus in the robber fly family Asilidae.

Species
Ktyr callarus 
Ktyr caucasicus 
Ktyr elegans 
Ktyr junctus 
Ktyr kazenasi 
Ktyr kerzhneri 
Ktyr normalis 
Ktyr protensis

References

Asilidae genera
Asilinae